"Dokolica" ("Boredom") is the second single recorded and released by the Serbian new wave band Električni Orgazam. It was released in 1982 by Jugoton. The song also appeared on the band's second album Lišće prekriva Lisabon and various artists compilation Vrući dani i vrele noći.

This 7" marks its place in the Yugoslav discography as one of the first providing a dub version on the B-side.

Track listing
A	 	"Dokolica"
B	 	"Dokolica" (dub verzija)

Personnel
Arranged and produced by Električni Orgazam 
Producer: Toni Jurij
Written by Srđan Gojković

External links

Električni Orgazam songs
1982 singles
1982 songs
Jugoton singles